Euny Hong is a Korean-American journalist and author, based in France.

Biography
Hong is a Paris-based author of three books. The novel Kept: A Comedy of Sex and Manners was published by Simon and Schuster in 2006. The Birth of Korean Cool: How One Nation is Conquering the World Through Pop Culture was published by Picador Books in the US/Simon & Schuster in the UK in 2014, and has been published in seven languages. It was named an Amazon Editor's Pick. Her third book, The Power of Nunchi: The Korean Secret to Success and Happiness, was published by Penguin Random House in 2019. Her books have been translated into 18 languages, including French, Dutch, Spanish, Polish, Italian, German, Portuguese (standard and Brazilian), Indonesian, Thai, and Chinese.

Hong was a senior columnist for the U.S. edition of the Financial Times, where she wrote a weekly television column and other articles on culture. She was awarded a Fulbright Beginning Professional Journalism Award. Hong's works have appeared in The New York Times, The Wall Street Journal, The Washington Post, The New Republic, The Daily Beast, The Atlantic, and elsewhere.

Hong was born in New Jersey in the United States. At age 12, she moved to Seoul with her family, and was educated in both the Korean public school system and an international school (Seoul Foreign School). After high school, she returned to the U.S. to attend Yale University, from which she graduated with a B.A. in Philosophy. While at Yale, she was co-founder and the first Editor-in-Chief of  Rumpus Magazine, an undergraduate humour publication that remains in  publication. Hong lives in Paris, France, and was a journalist for France 24, an international news network. She has also lived in Frankfurt and Berlin, Germany. She is fluent in English, Korean, French, and German. Hong is a convert to Judaism .

Selected works
 
 
 
 
 
 

  Kept: A Comedy of Sex and Manners, Simon and Schuster, 2006. (German edition:"Katerfrüstuck in New York," Blanvalet 2008)
 The Birth of Korean Cool: How One Nation is Conquering the World Through Pop Culture. Picador, 2014 (US), Simon & Schuster (UK)
 "Resilience in Paris," Wall Street Journal Op-Ed, 13 Nov. 2015 Conan O’Brien accidentally exposed the culture gap between Koreans and Korean-Americans, Quartz, April 13, 2016
 K-Pop Music and the Hallyu Hullabaloo, Wall Street Journal (Op-Ed)
 Charlie Hebdo’s gross out cartoons are an ancient French tradition worth preservingJustin Timberlake is going to ruin Eurovision, Quartz, 13 May 2016
 "Teaching Germany to Grin and Bear Cheerleading," The New York Times, November 30, 2003.
 "Rise of the New Europe in Euro Pop," The New York Times, May 26, 2003.
 "Growing Up Gangnam-Style: What the Seoul Neighborhood Was Really Like," The Atlantic, September 24, 2012.
 "The Crazy, All-Night Goldman Sachs Scavenger Hunt," The Atlantic, June 27, 2013.
 "The biggest royal event in France since Versailles: Burger King is coming back," Quartz,  November 30, 2012.
 "In the Future, Your Champagne Will Come From England," The Atlantic, September 24, 2012.
 "No transit, no power, but my bank loves me: Hurricane Sandy’s flood of marketing emails," Quartz, October 30, 2012.
 "Unfamous Valley: Why it sucks to be not quite famous, Quartz, July 21, 2017.

See also
 Koreans in New York City
 New Yorkers in journalism
 Popular culture

References

American writers of Korean descent
Living people
American women journalists
Yale University alumni
Jewish American journalists
Year of birth missing (living people)
21st-century American Jews
21st-century American women